Karachi United Football Club is a Pakistani professional football club based in Clifton, Karachi. Karachi United competed in the Karachi Football League, one of the top leagues of Karachi. It currently competes in the Pakistan Premier League, the first tier of the Pakistani football league system.

Formed in 1996, the club turned professional in 2013. In October 2020, the club was promoted to the Pakistan Premier League for the first time, courtesy of a second-place finish in the 2020 PFF League. It therefore made its top-flight debut in the 2021 Pakistan Premier League.

They were also members of the Karachi Football League, a semi-professional football league. Club has also competed in the 2016 PFF Cup, the highest football level in Pakistan that year. They reached the quarter-finals, in which they were defeated by PIA FC.

Karachi United uses the 2,000-capacity Karachi United Stadium for most of their home games. The team is sponsored by Engro Corporation.

History

Formation and growth 
The club was formed in 1996 by Taha Alizai, Imran Ali and Ali Ata in Clifton, Karachi. It started its youth academy in 2001. This was followed by the launch of the Karachi Football League and the Schools Championship in 2003 and 2005, respectively. It initiated its youth summer camp in 2009, and the next year, it launched its community program as well as the women division. It acquired its own stadium in 2015.

As of 2021, it has established 12 community centers in Karachi which cater to over 1,000 children, including 200 girls. In these centers, the club provides free football coaching to kids from underprivileged communities, providing them educational and health assistance. It also employs 10-12 full-time staff members which include a community administrator, a community program manager, a fundraising manager, a brand manager, an academy manager, a social media manager, and some coaches. There are 150 other part-time coaches. Some of the coaches are from the local communities while others are former national team players.

Turning professional 
In 2013, Karachi United launched their professional team to compete in Pakistan's second tier of league football. They made their debut in the departmental phase of the 2013 PFF League. They ended first in their group and advanced to the final phase where they finished last.

In 2014, the club participated in the departmental phase of the 2014 PFF League. They finished bottom of Group C, failing to win both of their matches.

In the 2020 PFF League, Karachi United finished at the top of group A and advanced to the final phase, where they finished second, and thus, after a struggle of many years, were finally promoted to the Pakistan Premier League.

Karachi United made its top-flight debut at the 2021 Pakistan Premier League. As of November 6, 2021, it occupies 9th position.

Rivalries 
Karachi United has a rivalry with Masha United with which they have the United Derby. The derby started in 2020 PFF League where the match ended in a tie.

Crest and colours

Karachi United's colours are red, white and black. White is used as the away colour. The club represents Teen Talwar on their logo, as it is one of the most popular monuments in the city of Karachi.

Women's team
The women's team was established in 2010, with the goal of creating a national team capable of representing the nation in FIFA Women's World Cup. In September 2016, the women's team represented Pakistan at the International Women's Football Cultural Festival in Berlin.

Youth teams

Manchester United tour 
In July 2004, Karachi United became the first team from Pakistan to visit one of the premier football clubs of the world when its 14-member under-15 youth academy team went on a week-long tour to the Manchester United Soccer Schools (MUSS) in Manchester, a trip sponsored by ABN Amro. The team was coached by a Manchester United coach for a week, and also played three matches against local opposition. The players also took part in seminars relating to diet and on other football-related subjects. The team also visited the Manchester United first team training at their facility at Carrington, where it spent time in the company of manager Alex Ferguson, assistant manager Carlos Queiroz (former manager of Real Madrid), and players such as Roy Keane, Alan Smith, and Rio Ferdinand.

Charlton Athletic academy call-ups 
In July 2006, two youth academy players, Atif Sachak and Kareem Kerai, were selected for a pre-season two-week academy and community programmes at Premier League club's Charlton Athletic youth academy in a bid to enhance their football skills. A few days later, both the players were drafted into Charlton's under-13 side for a match against a visiting American club.

Qatar tours 
In September 2008, the youth team was invited to Qatar on a week-long tour play matches against the youth teams of Al-Ahli and Al Sadd football clubs as well as train at the prestigious Aspire Academy for Sports Excellence. The tour was a successful one, with Karachi United winning 3-1 against Al-Ahli's U-17 team after being beaten by them 3-0. They also drew 2-2 against Al Sadd.

In September 2011, it was invited again to Qatar on a five-day tour to train and play matches versus Aspire Academy, Al Sadd and other local clubs. The highlight of the tour was a 2-2 draw against Aspire Academy, which is considered one of the world’s top schools for sporting excellence.

Barcelona tour 
In February 2017, Karachi United became the first Pakistani club to tour Spanish giants FC Barcelona. During their week long tour, the Karachi United squad, comprising 53 people (44 players and 9 officials), was given six coaching sessions by coaches from FCB, where they learnt about the FCB training philosophy and their values. The squad was housed at the Marcet Fundacion, a renowned Catalonian youth set-up through whose ranks players such as Keylor Navas came through. During their stay, Karachi United’s four teams (two under-13 teams, with one of the teams comprising both boys and girls, and two under-16 teams) played over 15 matches against local opposition. The squad also visited La Masia, the famed FC Barcelona Youth Academy and observed a number of the FCB youth boys and girls teams' matches. Having earlier also visited the FCB Museum and Camp Nou, they wrapped up their tour by watching FC Barcelona beat Leganes live 2-1 courtesy of a late Lionel Messi penalty.

Aspire bilateral series 
KU's youth team were invited to play a four-match bilateral series against Aspire Academy in Doha in March 2019. The under-12 side managed to win all four matches in the series, grabbing a 4-2 win in the first game and winning the second and third fixtures 4-0. It won the fourth match 5-3 on penalty shootout after a goalless draw. The under-11 team won their first game 4-1, but lost their second and third fixtures 3-4 and 1-2. It won the fourth match 3-0, and was thus awarded the series victory courtesy of aggregate results.

Aspire Tri-series Football Tournament 
In November 2019, KU was invited by the Aspire Academy to Doha to participate in a tri-series football tournament. KU bagged the tri-Series title in U-12 and U-11 categories by winning against Turkish club Fenerbahce SK and Aspire Academy, respectively.

References

External links

 Karachi United FC at Soccerway

Football clubs in Pakistan
Football in Karachi
1996 establishments in Pakistan
Association football clubs established in 1996